Poetica is the name of a calligraphic, ornamental typeface designed by Robert Slimbach for Adobe Systems in 1992. As one of the first of the Adobe Originals family of typefaces including a swash version, it attained a wide usage in digital typography. Regarded as the first family of italic type in digital form, it is available in 21 weights to cater numerous design ideas in a single typeface family.

Poetica features a variety of different ampersand characters.

References

Adobe typefaces
Typefaces designed by Robert Slimbach
Script typefaces